Isaiah Arumainayagam was a former Indian association football player. He represented India internationally.

Playing career
Arumainayagam was part of the India national football team during the golden era of the country's football under coaching of legendary Syed Abdul Rahim. He was also part of the Indian team that achieved second place at the 1964 AFC Asian Cup in Israel.

In Mohun Bagan AC, he played with Jarnail Singh, Chuni Goswami and others in the 1960s.

Managerial career
He was the head coach of the India women's football team, when India's first international women's football tournament, named Jayalalitha Gold Cup	was held at Chennai in 1994.

Honours
Mohun Bagan
Durand Cup: 1963, 1964, 1965
IFA Shield: 1961, 1962, 1967
Rovers Cup: 1966
Calcutta Football League: 1962, 1963, 1964, 1965

India
Asian Games Gold medal: 1962
AFC Asian Cup runners-up: 1964
Merdeka Tournament third-place: 1966

Individual
Mohun Bagan Ratna: 2014

See also
History of Indian football

References

Bibliography

Indian footballers
India international footballers
1964 AFC Asian Cup players
Asian Games medalists in football
Footballers from Bangalore
Mohun Bagan AC players
Medalists at the 1962 Asian Games
Footballers at the 1962 Asian Games
Footballers at the 1966 Asian Games
Asian Games gold medalists for India
Association footballers not categorized by position
Calcutta Football League players
India women's national football team managers
Indian football managers